The Inter-Allied Games was a one-off multi-sport event held from 22 June to 6 July 1919 at the newly constructed Pershing Stadium just outside Paris, France following the end of World War I. The host stadium had been built near the Bois de Vincennes by the U.S. Military in cooperation with the YMCA. The event was only open to participation by military personnel who were currently serving or had formerly served in the armed forces during the War. Around 1500 athletes from a total of eighteen nations participated in the proceedings which featured nineteen sports. Following the conclusion of the games, Pershing Stadium was presented as a gift to the people of France from the United States of America.  The area, still known as Le Stade Pershing, continues to be used as an open air recreation park to this day.

Sports
A total of nineteen sports were contested at the games. A number of military-oriented events was initially planned, but only hand-grenade throwing and shooting made it on to the final programme.

Participating nations
A total of twenty-eight nations from the Allies of World War I were invited to the competition and eighteen nations accepted the invitation. China aimed to compete, but ultimately was unable to send any athletes to the games within the timescale. It did, however, provide medals and trophies in support of the games. The Kingdom of Hejaz sent a delegation but with no athletes, choosing to demonstrate the skills of their Arabian horsemen instead. A full list of participants was made by the organisers.

Gold medalists
These athletes competed in and won gold medals at the 1919 Inter-Allied Games:
Ralph Parcaut - Gold Medal, Light Heavyweight Division, Catch as Catch Can Wrestling
Paul Prehn - Gold Medal, Middleweight Division, Catch as Catch Can Wrestling
Gene Tunney - Gold Medal, Boxing
Max Friedman - Gold medal, Basketball
Norman Ross - 5 Gold Medals, Swimming
Carl F. Haas, William Clinton Gray, Floyd F. Campbell, and Lawrence M. Shields - Medley Relay Race
United States of America, First Place, Rifle Shooting Team, Team Members include - Brigadier General Paul A. Wolf

References
Bell, Daniel (2003). Encyclopedia of International Games. McFarland and Company, Inc. Publishers, Jefferson, North Carolina. .
Full text of The inter-allied games, Paris, 22nd June to 6th July, 1919. Albert R Mann, Cornell University Library.

External links

Report on football tournament
List Track and Field results
A description of the basketball tournament

Multi-sport events in France
Sports competitions in Paris
1919 in multi-sport events
1919 in French sport
World War I
International sports competitions hosted by France
Defunct multi-sport events
1919 in European sport
June 1919 events
July 1919 events
1919 in Paris